In sociology, an occupational closure (or professional demarcation) is the process whereby a trade or occupation (vocation) transforms itself, or tries to transform itself, into a true profession by closing off entry to the profession to all but those people who are suitably qualified, as defined by the practitioners already practicing the occupation in any given jurisdiction. This can be achieved by licensure (occupational licensing) and professional certification, barring entry to all except those who have passed certain entrance examinations and grades of training, or by allowing entry only to those who have gained membership of a specific professional body (a professional association, such as a particular medical society). It can also be achieved by trade unionism, and most especially craft unionism as contrasted with industrial unionism, in countries where sufficient union membership (as a percentage of workers in an occupation) can be achieved despite the prevailing gradient of union busting. 

What this means in practical terms, is that an architect or physician, for example, will firstly be a university graduate in their main subject, second, will have passed entrance examinations to join a recognised professional body and thirdly, will also be licensed to practise medicine or architecture, usually also obtained through sitting examinations. Therefore, such professions are open only to those who satisfy these requirements and are closed to everyone else. It is thus illegal for any other person to practice medicine or to pose as an architect.

Occupational closure has both benefit and potential harm (to society), which must be counterbalanced. The benefit is that it ensures that the service provided by a profession to the public remains a high-quality service, with as few incompetents, quacks, charlatans, and scammers as it is humanly possible to prevent. The potential harm concerns the problems of credentialism and educational inflation (forms of rent-seeking) and even the creation of red tape–induced regional or nationwide staffing shortages. Although fighting against the potential harms is laudable and necessary, it cannot be done too aggressively without allowing the prevalence of quality lapses (poor service quality) and malpractice to rise. An optimal balance must be sought by administrators, regulators, and (in some cases) legislators. 

The origin of this process is said to have been with guilds during the Middle Ages, when 'professionals' fought for exclusive rights to practice their crafts or trades as journeymen, and to engage unpaid apprentices.

See also
Credentialism
Licensure
Occupational licensing
Profession
Professionalization

References

Further reading
 
 
 
 
 

Professional titles and certifications
Occupations
Sociological terminology